Mangaliso Ngema, is a South African actor best known for his roles in the popular serials Vehicle 19, Mary and Martha and Lithapo.

Personal life
He was born and raised in Orlando West, Soweto, South Africa.

He was married to a Mozambique woman and is a father of one daughter. However, his baby was sold by the nurse who was working in that hospital. Later his wife also divorced him.

Career
He moved into the corporate world and worked as a brand manager for Guinness. While working there, he made the television debut with the soap opera Generations and played the role of 'Lunga Zondo' in 1993. Then he made several notable appearances in the serials: Home Affairs, Housekeepers, MTV Shuga, Ring of Lies, Mzansi, Side Dish, Soul Buddyz and Single Guyz.

He played the role 'Pabi' on the television serial Lithapo. However, after sexual harassment incident on Lorraine Moropa, he was fired from the show. However he later dispel allegations of sexual harassment.

In September 2020, he appeared in the television serial Family Secrets.

Rape Allegations 
In June 2022 Ngema was charged with rape and released on bail after appearing at the Randburg Magistrate’s Court.

Filmography

References

External links
 
 Mangaliso Ngema breaks his silence on sexual harassment claims

Living people
South African male television actors
South African male film actors
People from Soweto
Year of birth missing (living people)